Mont Clare  or Montclare may refer to:

Places 
 Montclare, Chicago, Illinois, a neighborhood on the west side of the city, near Elmwood Park
 Mont Clare (Metra), a train station serving the Chicago neighborhood
 Mont Clare, Pennsylvania, a village in Montgomery County, or the estate that gave the village its current name
 Mont Clare Bridge, a bridge connecting the Pennsylvania village
 Mont Clare Station, the former village rail road station
Mont Clare, South Carolina, a village in Darlington County

Other 
 Mont Clare, a line of stainless steel flatware from Waterford Wedgwood
 , a Canadian Pacific Steamships ship built in 1921 for passenger service, pressed into the Royal Navy for World War II

See also 
 Montclair (disambiguation), the French spelling
 Montclar (disambiguation)
 Mount Clare (disambiguation)
 Clairemont (disambiguation)
 Clairmont (disambiguation)
 Claremont (disambiguation)
 Clermont (disambiguation)